The Society for Health Systems (SHS) is a professional society within the Institute of Industrial and Systems Engineers to the support the industrial engineering profession and individuals involved with improving quality and productivity within healthcare.

External links 
 

Engineering societies based in the United States
Industrial engineering
Health care-related professional associations based in the United States
International organizations based in the United States